Seo So-yung (born 2 March 1981) is a South Korean swimmer who represented South Korea at the 1996 Summer Olympic Games.

Career 

She finished 41st in the women's 50 metre freestyle with a new national record of 27.30, 19th in the women's 4 × 100 metre freestyle relay and 18th in the women's 4 × 200 metre freestyle relay.

References 

1981 births
Living people
Swimmers at the 1996 Summer Olympics
Olympic swimmers of South Korea
South Korean female freestyle swimmers